Chica Ideal may refer to:

"Chica Ideal" (Sebastián Yatra and Guaynaa song), 2020
"Chica Ideal", 2013 song by Chino & Nacho
"Chika Ideal", 2004 song by Ivy Queen